David Marshall Coulthard  (born 27 March 1971) is a British former racing driver from Scotland, later turned presenter, commentator and journalist. He was runner-up in the  championship, driving for McLaren.

Coulthard began karting at the age of eleven and achieved early success before progressing to car racing in the British Formula Ford Championship and the Formula 3000 series. He first drove in Formula One with Williams in the 1994 season succeeding the late Ayrton Senna. The following year he won his first Grand Prix in Portugal, and then for the 1996 season he moved to McLaren. After winning two races in the 1997 season, he finished 3rd in the World Drivers' Championship in the 1998 season.

He won five races during 1999 and 2000 before finishing 2nd in the Drivers' Championship to Michael Schumacher in 2001. Two more victories followed between 2002 and 2003 before he left McLaren at the end of 2004. He moved to Red Bull in 2005 and secured their first podium a year later. Coulthard retired from Formula One racing at the end of 2008.

After retiring from Formula One, Coulthard continued working with Red Bull as a consultant and joined the BBC as a commentator and pundit for their coverage of Formula One. He returned to active motorsports in 2010 joining Mücke Motorsport in DTM and retired at the end of 2012. Coulthard has also participated in the Race of Champions, finishing runner-up in the Drivers' Cup in 2008, and winning the competition in 2014 and 2018. Since 2016 he has worked as a commentator and analyst for Channel 4 after they took over the BBC's terrestrial television rights.

In 2019, he was elected president of the British Racing Drivers' Club (owner of Silverstone Circuit).

Early life and career

Coulthard was born on 27 March 1971 in Twynholm, Kirkcudbrightshire, Scotland, one of three children to road haulier Duncan Coulthard and Elizabeth Joyce Coulthard née Marshall. His family was connected to motor racing: his grandfather competed in the Monte Carlo Rally and his father drove karts, becoming Scottish National Champion. From an early age motorsport was where his interest lay, later listing Formula One World Champions Jim Clark, Nigel Mansell and Alain Prost as his childhood heroes. Coulthard was educated at Kirkcudbright Academy, achieving eight O-grades.

Coulthard began karting when his father presented him with his first kart for his eleventh birthday. Having won several local karting championships including the Scottish Junior Kart Championship and the Scottish Kart Championship, Coulthard participated in events further down the UK, including title victory in the Cumbria Kart Racing Club Championship in 1985. Coulthard graded each race he entered on a scale of 1 to 10, with an additional column headlined "Performance". He later gave credit to David Leslie, senior and junior for allowing his career to develop.

In 1989, Coulthard made the transition from karting to car racing. It is often erroneously claimed that he won the British Formula Ford Championship that season, however this is not the case. Coulthard actually won the lesser P&O Ferries Formula Ford 1600 Junior championship.

He became the first recipient of the McLaren/Autosport Young Driver of the Year award, which allowed him to test a McLaren Formula One car. In 1990, Coulthard travelled to Belgium to compete in the EFDA Nations Cup for Great Britain and was partnered with Nicky Hart, where they finished 9th. During the year, Coulthard was selected by Vauxhall Motorsport to race in a one-off appearance in the British Touring Car Championship (BTCC) at Brands Hatch, where he finished 13th. He did not return to the series after suffering a leg injury in a Formula Vauxhall race at Spa-Francorchamps.

For 1991, Coulthard signed with Paul Stewart Racing to compete in the British Formula 3 series, taking five victories and finishing second in the Championship behind Rubens Barrichello. Coulthard won the Macau Grand Prix and the Masters of Formula Three. He later traveled to the Fuji Speedway to compete in the annual Formula Three Fuji Cup, taking pole position and finished second behind Jordi Gené.

In 1992, he moved to the International Formula 3000 series, where he suffered from a lack of competitiveness and finished ninth in the championship. For 1993, Coulthard joined Pacific Racing, taking one victory and finishing third in the series. He entered the 24 Hours of Le Mans alongside John Nielsen and David Brabham for the TWR Jaguar Racing team. The trio won the GT Class, although they were later disqualified for a technical infringement. He moved to the Vortex team in 1994, which received investment from a private investor, allowing Coulthard to drive for the team. In his first and only race for the team held at Silverstone, Coulthard finished third.

Formula One career

Williams (1994–1995)

1994

Throughout 1993 and 1994, Coulthard was employed by the Williams team as their official test driver. A race seat became available after the death of Ayrton Senna in the 1994 San Marino Grand Prix. Coulthard received a telephone call from team principal Frank Williams to test the Williams car at Jerez circuit over four days, causing him to miss a Formula 3000 race at Pau.

Making his début in Spain, Coulthard qualified in eighth position, and was set to score a point before his engine failed 34 laps from the finish. He followed this up by scoring his first points with a fifth-place finish in Canada. Williams dropped Coulthard for the following race in France, allowing 1992 Drivers' Champion Nigel Mansell to make a one-off appearance due to pressure from engine supplier Renault. The move strained the relationship between Williams and Coulthard who returned for the British Grand Prix, finishing fifth. For Germany, Williams introduced a revised version of their car, the Williams FW16B. He suffered back to back retirements in the next two races but secured three consecutive points scoring positions—including a podium finish with a second-place in Portugal. Mansell later returned to fill Coulthard's seat for the final three races of the season. Coulthard finished the season in eighth place with Williams first in the Constructors' Championship. For his role, Coulthard was awarded BBC Young Sports Personality of the Year and received an award at the BBC Scottish Sports Personality of the Year.

In November, Coulthard became embroiled in a contract dispute. During the Australian Grand Prix, Coulthard chose to leave Williams and signed a contract with McLaren. Williams, however, insisted that they had the right to exercise their option to keep Coulthard, who was on a three-year contract with the team. Coulthard's management argued that the Williams option was not binding. The dispute went to Formula One's Contract Recognition Board, who ruled in favour of Williams on 14 December, forcing Coulthard to stay with the team.

1995

In 1995, Coulthard again competed with Williams alongside Damon Hill. He was optimistic for the season, saying: "I'd like to think I can win a Grand Prix this year. That's really my aim, plus to score points in as many races as possible." Coulthard's season started off with controversy when he and Benetton driver Michael Schumacher were disqualified for fuel irregularities in the first round in Brazil, where Coulthard finished second. On appeal, the original results of both drivers were reinstated. The next five races saw four retirements for Coulthard, plus a fourth-place finish in San Marino.

Despite his poor form in the early part of the season, Coulthard secured four consecutive podiums, with a further two consecutive retirements in Belgium and Italy. For Portugal, Williams introduced a revised version of their car, the Williams FW17B. Coulthard took pole position and led a majority of the race to take his first Formula One race victory. He took a further two podiums at the Nürburgring and Aida and retired in the final two races at Suzuka and Adelaide. Coulthard finished the season third in the Drivers' Championship, helping Williams secure second place in the Constructors' Championship.

McLaren (1996–2004)

1996

For 1996, Coulthard partnered experienced driver Mika Häkkinen at McLaren, and believed there was a chance of winning races, though a challenge for the World Championship was unlikely until 1997 or 1998. His season started badly; he suffered a throttle issue in Australia, including a collision with Jordan driver Martin Brundle on the first lap. Coulthard spun off in Brazil and finished outside the points in Argentina. However, Coulthard secured a podium at the Nürburgring and led the race in San Marino before suffering a hydraulic failure.

He followed the result with a second-place finish in the wet race at Monaco before suffering a first-lap accident in the wet race in Spain. Before the Canadian Grand Prix, Coulthard signed an extension to his contract that would keep him at McLaren until 1998. Coulthard secured points finishing positions in the next four races, before suffering three consecutive retirements. He rounded these results by finishing outside the points-scoring positions in Portugal and Japan. Coulthard managed to secure seventh place in the Drivers' Championship.

1997
In 1997, Coulthard again partnered Häkkinen at McLaren. He started his season by taking victory in the opening round in Australia. Coulthard was unable to score in the next four rounds, due to being involved in a collision in Argentina and contended with unreliability with his car. The factor of unreliability had an impact throughout the season, which became notable in Canada when Coulthard made a pit stop while leading and the car developed clutch problems. He suffered from four more retirements throughout the season, and was able to take victory at the Italian Grand Prix. He was able to secure two more podium positions in Austria and Jerez, where Coulthard conceded second place to teammate Häkkinen under team orders. Coulthard managed to finish in third place in the Drivers' Championship, tied on points with Benetton driver Jean Alesi.

1998

In 1998, Coulthard remained at McLaren and continued to be partnered by Häkkinen. The season started controversially in Australia for the McLaren team when Coulthard, who was leading let Häkkinen past to win the race. Coulthard later revealed a pre-race agreement by the team that whoever led into the first corner on the first lap would be allowed to win the race. However, the race marked a run of consistent results, with Coulthard scoring three further podiums, including victory in San Marino. Coulthard retired from three out of the next four races, and followed this up by taking a further five podiums during the remainder of the season, including a retirement in Italy.

His only finish outside the points-scoring positions was in Belgium, following a 7th-place finish. In wet conditions, Coulthard initially crashed out on the first lap, triggering an enormous multi-car collision. The race was restarted, and he was later involved in a controversial collision with Michael Schumacher when being lapped, leading to an angry confrontation in the pit lane. Coulthard came third in the Drivers' Championship, behind Schumacher and Häkkinen, and helped McLaren clinch the Constructors' Championship. Coulthard was awarded the Hawthorn Memorial Trophy, an annual award given to the most successful British or Commonwealth driver in Formula One over the course of one season.

1999

Coulthard stayed with McLaren, alongside Häkkinen for 1999. His season got off with two consecutive retirements in Australia and Brazil caused by hydraulics and gearbox failures, respectively. Coulthard managed to clinch second place in San Marino before suffering from another gearbox issue at Monaco. He took his second podium of the year in Spain before Coulthard later finished outside the points-scoring positions in Canada and retired with electrical problems in France.

Coulthard managed to secure six consecutive finishes inside of the points, which included victories in Britain and Belgium and podium finishes in Austria and Hungary. His season was rounded by three consecutive retirements in the final rounds of the season. Overall, Coulthard finished in fourth place in the Drivers' Championship, six points behind Jordan driver Heinz-Harald Frentzen, and helped McLaren take second place in the Constructors' Championship.

2000

For 2000, Coulthard reorganised his schedule for the season, concentrating on his performances and spending less time working on promotional campaigns. Many motorsport critics labelled 2000 as Coulthard's "make or break" year.

The first rounds of the season proved difficult for Coulthard; In the opening round in Australia, he retired from engine problems, and finished second in Brazil, before being disqualified as the front wing endplates on his car 7mm lower than the required 50mm above the reference plane. Coulthard overcame these setbacks and finished on the podium in the next five races, which included victories in Britain and Monaco. In June, Coulthard signed an extension to his contract, confirming he would remain at McLaren for 2001. A non-points scoring finish in Canada, followed victory in France, a victory which he later described as the most memorable of his career which also happened to be McLaren's only ever win at the Magny-Cours circuit. A hat-trick of podiums followed in the next three rounds and secured a fourth-place finish in Belgium. Coulthard was involved in a multi-car collision on the first lap in Italy. This would be marked by scoring points in the final three rounds, including podiums in Japan and Malaysia. Coulthard finished third in the Drivers' Championship, with 73 points, and McLaren finished second in the Constructors' Champions. For his efforts during the season, Coulthard was awarded his second Hawthorn Memorial Trophy.

2001

McLaren team principal Ron Dennis was ambitious about Coulthard's prospects for the new season, saying: "David is extremely fired up. He's strong and wants to test as much as possible. I honestly feel that David can win the world championship this year." Coulthard performed well in the first seven races, scoring forty points, including victories in Brazil and Austria. In Canada, he suffered his first retirement of the season when his car developed engine problems while running in fourth position. Coulthard followed his non-finish with a podium at the Nürburgring and by finishing fourth in France.

The remaining seven races saw Coulthard retire on three more occasions and achieved four more podium positions—in Hungary, Belgium, the United States and Japan. Overall, Coulthard secured a career best second place in the Drivers' Championship, 58 points behind World Champion Michael Schumacher. As a result, Coulthard was awarded with his second consecutive Hawthorn Memorial Trophy, and third overall (1998, 2000 and 2001).

2002
The 2002 season was the first in which Coulthard was the more experienced driver in his team. He was optimistic for the new season, saying: "If they need an opinion then they have to come to me this year. In the past they didn't. But that said, it's important for me not to get bogged down in the history of what happened in the past. We just have to go forward." He endured a torrid start: Coulthard's car suffered from gearbox issues and retired after 35 laps; and in the following race in Malaysia, both cars retired from engine failure after 24 laps. Two weeks later in the Brazilian Grand Prix, Coulthard secured his first podium of the season with a third-place finish. The start managed to get better as Coulthard took four consecutive finishes inside of the points; this included his only victory of the season in Monaco.

At the Canadian Grand Prix, Coulthard took his second consecutive podium by finishing second. He retired from the next race at the Nürburgring due to a collision with Williams driver Juan Pablo Montoya. This marked a turning point as Coulthard managed to finish five out of the next eight races in the points with a non-finish at the final round of the season in Japan. Coulthard finished the season fifth in the Drivers' Championship, with 41 points. Coulthard was awarded his third consecutive Hawthorn Memorial Trophy for his efforts during the 2002 season.

2003
Coulthard was again partnered at McLaren by Räikkönen for 2003. Former World Drivers' Champion Niki Lauda aired doubts over Coulthard's ability to handle pressure with teammate Räikkönen over the coming season, saying: "Coulthard has the advantage of experience - as I did over Prost - but in qualifying Raikkonen has put him under a lot of pressure."

Coulthard began the season by taking victory in Australia and retired in Malaysia when his car developed an electrical problem. He managed to take back-to-back points in Brazil and San Marino as he was retired from a collision in Spain. In August, Coulthard signed an extension to his contract that would keep him at McLaren until 2004. Coulthard was able to secure two more podium positions in Germany and Japan. Coulthard finished seventh in the Drivers' Championship, scoring 51 points. After the season's conclusion, McLaren announced that Coulthard would be dropped at the end of 2004 and replaced by Juan Pablo Montoya. Coulthard earned his fourth consecutive Hawthorn Memorial Trophy for his efforts during the season.

2004

Coulthard went into the 2004 season with McLaren knowing he would lose his seat at the end of the year. However, he insisted he had his team's backing, and pledged that his approach for 2004 would be more aggressive. He endured a consistent start: Coulthard managed to finish eighth in the first race in Australia despite being off the pace, and in the following race in Malaysia, he managed to take sixth position. During the race in Bahrain, both McLaren drivers were forced into retirement due to engine failures after fifty laps. Coulthard did not score in the next four races, which included consecutive retirements in Monaco and at the Nürburgring. He was able to take points scoring positions at the next two races in Canada and the United States.

McLaren introduced a revised version of their car the McLaren MP4-19B in France. The change of car improved reliability and results, helping Coulthard to achieve sixth place during the Grand Prix, and secured further points in the races in Britain and the Hockenheimring. Coulthard managed to further points in Belgium and Italy, only suffering from one further non-finish from a collision with Ferrari driver Rubens Barrichello in Japan. Overall, Coulthard finished tenth in the Drivers' Championship, equal on points with Ralf Schumacher, and did not score any podium finishes during the season.

Red Bull (2005–2008)

2005

Following the purchase of the Jaguar team by Red Bull, Coulthard announced on 17 December 2004 that he would leave McLaren to move to Red Bull for the 2005 season. He signed a one-year deal for a reported £1.8 million to drive alongside Austrian driver Christian Klien. Coulthard was offered a testing role at Ferrari, which he declined as he decided to remain in a race seat.

Coulthard began the season by scoring points in four of the first five races. Before the San Marino Grand Prix, Klien was replaced by Red Bull test driver Vitantonio Liuzzi who partnered Coulthard for the next four races. The forced withdrawal of all teams using Michelin tyres, including Red Bull, at the controversial United States Grand Prix, meant Coulthard did not start a race for the first time in his career. In July, it was announced that Coulthard would remain at Red Bull for 2006. This marked a turning point in his season as Coulthard did not score points in six of the nine remaining races. He achieved points three times during this period—in Germany, Turkey and Japan. He finished the season in twelfth place with Red Bull seventh in the Constructors' Championship.

2006

Coulthard stayed with Red Bull in 2006, and continued to be partnered by Klien. Coulthard started his season with retirements in Bahrain and in the following race in Malaysia whilst running tenth. The next three races saw Coulthard finish outside the points-scoring positions with consecutive retirements in San Marino and the Nürburgring. Coulthard secured Red Bull Racing's first podium position by finishing 3rd in Monaco. He managed to finish in the next ten races he entered which included finishing in the points in Canada, the United States and Hungary.

In August, it was announced that Coulthard had extended his contract with Red Bull for 2007 and would be partnered by Williams driver Mark Webber. Before the Chinese Grand Prix, Klien lost his seat at Red Bull, so Coulthard was partnered with Robert Doornbos. Coulthard finished the season by finishing 13th in the Drivers' Championship, with 14 points.

2007

Coulthard continued as a driver at Red Bull in 2007, partnered by Webber. He endured a torrid start: Coulthard retired in Australia following a collision with Williams driver Alexander Wurz, and in the following race in Malaysia, he retired with brake problems. In Bahrain, Coulthard ran in eighth position before his car developed driveshaft problems and was forced to retire. He was able to score his first points of the season by taking fifth position in Spain. Coulthard finished outside the points, with consecutive retirements in Canada and the United States, before he secured fifth position in the European Grand Prix. In July, it was announced that Coulthard would remain with Red Bull in 2008. Coulthard secured tenth position in the Drivers' Championship, with 14 points.

2008

Coulthard started the season with a retirement after colliding with Ferrari driver Felipe Massa. In Malaysia Coulthard's suffered from a suspension failure on his car during practice which resulted in Red Bull placed under investigation for car safety. Coulthard was later cleared to race, and managed to secure 9th. He was unable to score points until Canada, when he finished on the podium in 3rd. Before the British Grand Prix, where he retired on the first lap when he was hit by Toro Rosso driver Sebastian Vettel, Coulthard announced that he would retire from Formula One at the end of the season, though he would remain at Red Bull as a testing and development consultant.

Over the next five races, Coulthard was able to finish albeit outside the points-scoring positions. He took the final points of his career with seventh place in Singapore. In his final race in Brazil, Coulthard's Red Bull RB4 was decorated in the colours of "Wings for Life", a charity dedicated to raising awareness of spinal cord injuries. He was unable to finish the race, when his car was hit by Williams driver Nico Rosberg and Coulthard's car was sent into the path of Rosberg's teammate Kazuki Nakajima.

Race of Champions (2004–2009, 2011–present)

On 4 December 2004, Coulthard participated in his first Race of Champions for Great Britain alongside 1995 World Rally Champion Colin McRae. Coulthard was eliminated in the quarter-finals of the racing group having taken a time penalty, losing to Heikki Kovalainen. Coulthard and McRae were again chosen to compete in 2005, when the event was held in Stade de France. Coulthard was eliminated in the first round by Tom Kristensen and Great Britain were defeated by France in the semi-finals of the Nations Cup. In 2006, Coulthard was eliminated in the quarter-finals stage by Yvan Muller.

For 2007, Alister McRae partnered Coulthard after Colin McRae was killed in a helicopter crash. For the second consecutive year, Coulthard was eliminated at the quarter-final stage, this time by Sébastien Bourdais. On 30 October 2008, Coulthard was announced as one of the competitors of the event in 2008 for F1 Racing Great Britain, held at Wembley Stadium on 14 December. He reached the final of the Drivers' Cup and lost out to World Rally Champion Sébastien Loeb. In 2009, Coulthard raced for the All-Stars team alongside Giniel de Villiers. The pair were eliminated in Group B of the Nations Cup, and Coulthard was defeated in the quarter-finals of the World Finals by Sebastian Vettel.

Coulthard did not participate in 2010 and was replaced by BTCC driver Jason Plato. Coulthard returned for 2011, joining the All-Stars team alongside Filipe Albuquerque. Neither driver achieved success at the competition. In 2012, Coulthard remained in the Race of Champions and returned to compete for Great Britain, partnering Andy Priaulx. The pairing were eliminated in the group stages, with Coulthard being eliminated during the semi-finals by Kristensen in the Drivers' Cup.

For 2013, Coulthard was to be partnered by Williams development driver Susie Wolff, the first female competitor in the history of the Race of Champions. However, two weeks before the event was due to take place in Bangkok, the Sports Authority of Thailand and Race of Champions organisers announced the event would be cancelled due to political unrest in Thailand. For 2014, Coulthard went onto the Nation's Cup with Wolff and the pair reached the final, finishing runner-up to Team Nordic's Tom Kristensen and Petter Solberg. Coulthard then went on to win the Driver's Cup after beating Pascal Wehrlein in the final to claim his first Race of Champions Driver's title. He went on to beat Solberg to win the 2018 Race of Champions.

Later career

Media
On 25 November 2008, it was announced that Coulthard would join the BBC as a pundit alongside Jake Humphrey and Eddie Jordan for the broadcaster's coverage of Formula One. With the departure of commentator Jonathan Legard at the end of 2010, Coulthard was announced as a co-commentator alongside Brundle, after undergoing successful screen tests. He also writes a regular column for The Daily Telegraph and BBC Sport.

In 2016, Coulthard left the BBC to join Channel 4 after the BBC abandoned its coverage of Formula One. With Channel 4 he continued to commentate and be a co-presenter of their Formula 1 coverage. Coulthard co-owns Whisper Films, along with former co-presenter Jake Humphrey, and the production company was chosen by Channel 4 to produce its coverage of all of its races. He was offered a presenting role on Top Gear alongside Jordan but turned down the offer because "Channel 4 pulled a blinder".

For the 2017 Mexico City ePrix he made a guest appearance as an analyst for Channel 5 coverage. On 10 October 2018, Coulthard was announced as a spokesperson and advisory board member of the forthcoming W Series, a racing championship for women based on Formula 3-homologated Tatuus T-318 chassis. He is also a co-commentator for W Series.

Deutsche Tourenwagen Masters (2010–12)

2010

On 4 April 2010, Coulthard announced a return to motor racing when he secured a contract to drive for Mücke Motorsport and would be partnered by Maro Engel. Coulthard started the season by finishing in the first two races and retired from a collision in Lausitz. He managed to secure a further five consecutive finishes, although he did not score points in these races. Coulthard retired on the first lap of the next race at the Hockenheimring when he was involved in a multi-car collision. Coulthard rounded out the season with an eighth-place finish in Shanghai. Coulthard finished 16th in the Drivers' Championship, with one point.

2011
On 6 April 2011, it was announced that Coulthard would be retained by Mücke and would once again be partnered by Engel. Coulthard stated at 2010 was his "apprenticeship year" and pledged during 2011, that he would become more competitive. Coulthard started off his season by finishing in the first four races, albeit outside the points-scoring positions. He secured his only points of the year at the fifth race of the season at the Norisring, where he finished 8th. The remainder of the season saw Coulthard finish every race, although he was disqualified from the race at Ricardo Tormo as his car's rear wing was found to have been incorrectly mounted during the qualifying session. For the second consecutive year, Coulthard finished 16th in the Drivers' Championship, with one point.

2012
On 29 February 2012, it was announced that Coulthard would once again be retained by Mücke and would be partnered by Robert Wickens. Coulthard finished in the points with 8th position in the opening round held at the Hockenheimring. He did not score points in the next three races, which included a retirement at the Red Bull Ring. He recovered from this to take fifth position in the next round at the Norisring. Before the final race at the Hockenheim, Coulthard announced his retirement from motor racing, citing the reason to spend more time with his family and to concentrate on his co-commentary role with the BBC, as well as managing his off-track businesses. Overall, Coulthard secured fifteenth in the Drivers' Championship, with 14 points.

Driving style

Coulthard became known for having a smooth driving style. This style allowed him to perform at circuits where chicanes are common. However, this also meant that he was not suited to modern-day circuit configurations where a majority of the corners are taken at a medium-speed.

During his Formula Ford career, Coulthard gained a reputation of performing better at races than during qualifying sessions. The problem became particularly prevalent during 2003, when one-lap qualifying was introduced, in an effort for smaller teams to gain more television exposure. Coulthard became an open vocal opponent of the format, saying: "I just don't like the single-lap qualifying format, I don't think it's right that one lap judges whether you are fast or not."

Helmet design
Coulthard's helmet design is blue and consists of a white saltire on the top which resembles the flag of Scotland and the four tips are trespassed from the top of the chin area. Coulthard borrowed a helmet belonging to Michael Schumacher for the 1996 Monaco Grand Prix as his regular helmet was suffering from steaming up during the weekend. Upon Schumacher's first retirement in 2006, he suggested to Coulthard that he would swap one of his own helmets for one of Coulthard's, which was agreed by Coulthard. For the 2007 Japanese Grand Prix, he changed his design to grey with a stylised saltire on the sides of his helmet, as an homage to the late World Rally Champion Colin McRae.

Personal life
Coulthard has lived for some time in Monaco, and also owns homes in London, Belgium and Switzerland. He owns several luxury hotels in Britain and is a former owner of the Columbus Hotel Monaco, which is located in Monaco's Fontvieille.

On 2 May 2000, while he was leasing the Learjet of friend David Murray, the aeroplane developed engine trouble en route to Côte d'Azur International Airport in Nice and crashed while attempting an emergency landing at Lyon-Satolas Airport, France. Coulthard, his then-fiancée the American model Heidi Wichlinski and personal trainer/bodyguard Andy Matthews survived; Murray's personal pilot David Saunders and co-pilot Dan Worley died. Coulthard and Wichlinski ended their engagement before the beginning of the 2001 season, which was followed with a series of inaccurate newspaper reports about alleged affairs with other women.

Coulthard was involved in a four-year relationship with Brazilian model Simone Abdelnour, before ending the relationship in 2005. Coulthard became engaged to Karen Minier, a Belgian Formula One correspondent for French TV channel TF1, on 2 June 2006. The couple married in 2013.  Coulthard and Minier had their first child, Dayton Minier Coulthard, on 20 November 2008.

A museum in his home village, Twynholm, was dedicated to Coulthard, but it has now closed. It was previously run by Coulthard's sister Lynsay who died of an overdose of propranolol in February 2013. His half sister Elaine had died in her sleep in 2011. Fans in his home village are called "Twynosi" (a cross between Twynholm and the Italian word for "fans", tifosi, as used by Ferrari fans), who gather on race days. He released his autobiography in 2007, entitled It is What It Is. In it, he stated that he had suffered from bulimia as a teenager, caused by the need to lose weight when competing in karting championships. In 2008, Coulthard was best man at the wedding of Christian Hughes and actress/presenter Amanda Holden.

Coulthard's second cousin, New Zealander Fabian Coulthard, is also a racing driver, and has won several junior championships. He is currently racing in the Australian V8 Supercar Championship Series for Team Sydney.

Coulthard is an ambassador for the spinal injuries charity Wings For Life. He was appointed Member of the Order of the British Empire (MBE) in the 2010 Birthday Honours for services to motorsport. Coulthard is a Mercedes-Benz Brand Ambassador, and was involved with the development of the Mercedes-Benz SLS AMG.

Racing record

Career summary

Complete International Formula 3000 results
(key) (Races in bold indicate pole position) (Races
in italics indicate fastest lap)

Complete Formula One results
(key) (Races in bold indicate pole position; races in italics indicate fastest lap)

† Did not finish, but was classified as he had completed more than 90% of the race distance.

Complete 24 Hours of Le Mans results

Complete British Touring Car Championship results
(key) (Races in bold indicate pole position in class) (Races in italics indicate fastest lap in class)

Complete Deutsche Tourenwagen Masters results
(key) (Races in bold indicate pole position) (Races in italics indicate fastest lap)

† Retired, but was classified as he completed 90% of the winner's race distance

References

External links

1971 births
Living people
People educated at Kirkcudbright Academy
Sportspeople from Dumfries and Galloway
Survivors of aviation accidents or incidents
Scottish expatriates in Monaco
BRDC Gold Star winners
Scottish racing drivers
Formula Ford drivers
Formula One race winners
EFDA Nations Cup drivers
British Formula Three Championship drivers
International Formula 3000 drivers
24 Hours of Le Mans drivers
British Touring Car Championship drivers
Scottish Formula One drivers
McLaren Formula One drivers
Red Bull Formula One drivers
Williams Formula One drivers
Deutsche Tourenwagen Masters drivers
Members of the Order of the British Empire
BBC sports presenters and reporters
Mercedes-AMG Motorsport drivers
Mücke Motorsport drivers
Paul Stewart Racing drivers
Jaguar Racing drivers